John Smedley is the name of four generations of owners of Lea Mills, near Matlock, Derbyshire. The most famous of these was John Smedley (1803–1874), born at Wirksworth, Derbyshire.

Lea Mills
Lea Mills was founded in 1784 by Peter Nightingale (a relation of Florence Nightingale and former accountant to Richard Arkwright) and John Smedley (father of the better-known son of the same name). It was set up on a hilly site straddling a brook at Lea Bridge, just outside Matlock. The brook was used to both clean yarn and power machinery.

The mill specialised in the production of muslin and spinning cotton to send out to local cottages with hand frame looms. Towards the end of the 18th century, the company had extended its activities to include knitting and hosiery manufacture – said to be the origin of Long Johns. By this time, John Smedley was running the business alone, although the Nightingale family retained an interest in the property.

As Lea Mills remains open and an operational building to this day, manufacturing the company's range of designer knitwear, John Smedley claims to be the world's longest running factory manufacturer.

John Smedley 1803–1874

John Smedley's son, also named John Smedley, was born on 12 June 1803.

In 1819 the younger John Smedley began work as an apprentice. In 1825 he took over the running of the mill, and started an energetic expansion of its operations. The mill at this time had already diversified from cotton to wool, and from simply weaving to knitting. Smedley the younger's plan was to produce a wide range of finished garments, rather than simply manufacture cloth.

In 1847 he married Caroline Harward, the second daughter of John Harward the Vicar of Wirksworth.

Smedley's success and growing wealth enabled other grand projects. He developed an interest in hydrotherapy, and built Smedley's Hydro in Matlock, a spa resort that attracted patrons from around the world. As a family home he also built the massive and ostentatious Riber Castle on a hilltop overlooking Matlock. This is now one of Derbyshire's most famous landmarks.

Smedley died on 27 July 1874, and upon his death the business passed to his cousin, John T Marsden Smedley, and thence to John B Marsden Smedley. In 1893 the operation became a limited company.

Brand names

The designer label John Smedley is now familiar in boutiques, department stores and classic retailers around the world. The company sells to over 30 countries and has won numerous awards for its export achievements. The largest export market is Japan. There are concessions in some branches of Flannels and Fenwick.

See also
List of mills in Derbyshire

References

External links
the John Smedley company's commercial website
Autobiography of John Smedley, written 1868
BBC News: Staying in fashion for centuries

1803 births
1874 deaths
High fashion brands
British textile industry businesspeople
People from Derbyshire Dales (district)
People from Dethick, Lea and Holloway
19th-century English businesspeople